Semnani may refer to:
 Semnani language, one of the local languages of the Semnan Province of Iran
 Semnani languages, a group of Northwestern Iranian languages, spoken in Semnan province of Iran
 Semnani people, an Iranian people who primarily live in northern Iran and speak the Semnani language
 Ashraf Jahangir Semnani (12871386), a Sufi saint
 In biology
 Elachista semnani, a moth in the family Elachistidae
 Scrobipalpa semnani, a moth in the family Gelechiidae

See also 
 Semnan (disambiguation)
 

Iranian-language surnames